Cornelis Hermanus "Harry" Vermaas (born 23 January 1984) is a South African rugby union footballer who currently plays for USA Limoges in the French domestic Fédérale 1 competition. He is a versatile front rower who is capable of playing either at prop or at hooker and has also represented Leinster, the Blue Bulls, Boland Cavaliers, Pumas and the Springboks' Under-21 team.

External links
Vermaas joins Leinster

Stats 

South African rugby union players
Leinster Rugby players
Living people
1984 births
University of Pretoria alumni
Rugby union hookers
Blue Bulls players
Boland Cavaliers players
AS Béziers Hérault players